Băleni is a commune in, Dâmbovița County, Muntenia, Romania. It is composed of two villages, Băleni-Români (the commune center) and Băleni-Sârbi.

References

Communes in Dâmbovița County
Localities in Muntenia